In game theory, differential games are a group of problems related to the modeling and analysis of conflict in the context of a dynamical system.  More specifically, a state variable or variables evolve over time according to a differential equation.  Early analyses reflected military interests, considering two actors—the pursuer and the evader—with diametrically opposed goals.  More recent analyses have reflected engineering or economic considerations.

Connection to optimal control

Differential games are related closely with optimal control problems. In an optimal control problem there is single control  and a single criterion to be optimized; differential game theory generalizes this to two controls  and two criteria, one for each player. Each player attempts to control the state of the system so as to achieve its goal; the system responds to the inputs of all players.

History
In the study of competition, differential games have been employed since a 1925 article by Charles F. Roos. The first to study the formal theory of differential games was Rufus Isaacs, publishing a text-book treatment in 1965. One of the first games analyzed was the 'homicidal chauffeur game'.

Random time horizon
Games with a random time horizon are a particular case of differential games. In such games, the terminal time is a random variable with a given probability distribution function. Therefore, the players maximize the mathematical expectancy of the cost function. It was shown that the modified optimization problem can be reformulated as a discounted differential game over an infinite time interval

Applications

Differential games have been applied to economics. Recent developments include adding stochasticity to differential games and the derivation of the stochastic feedback Nash equilibrium (SFNE). A recent example is the stochastic differential game of capitalism by Leong and Huang (2010). In 2016 Yuliy Sannikov received the John Bates Clark Medal from the American Economic Association for his contributions to the analysis of continuous-time dynamic games using stochastic calculus methods.

Additionally, differential games have applications in missile guidance and autonomous systems.

For a survey of pursuit–evasion differential games see Pachter.

See also
Lotka–Volterra equations
Mean-field game theory

Notes

Further reading

External links

Control theory
Game theory game classes
Ballistics
Pursuit–evasion